Impeachment: An American History is a 2018 book by Jon Meacham, Timothy Naftali, Peter Baker, and Jeffrey A. Engel, published by Modern Library. Meacham, Naftali, and Baker describe the impeachments (or in the case of Nixon, unfinished impeachment proceedings) of Andrew Johnson, Richard Nixon, and Bill Clinton, respectively. Engel writes about the concept of impeachment and the likelihood of Donald Trump being impeached.

See also
 Efforts to impeach Donald Trump
 Impeachment in the United States
 Impeachment of Andrew Johnson
 Impeachment of Bill Clinton
 Impeachment process against Richard Nixon

Reception
Publishers Weekly wrote, "Well researched, thoughtful, and engagingly written, this is one of the best of the current books mulling this suddenly fraught question."

References

2018 non-fiction books
Books about American politicians
Books about Bill Clinton
Books about Donald Trump
Books about politics of the United States
Books about Richard Nixon
Presidential impeachment in the United States
Impeachment of Andrew Johnson
Works about the impeachment of Bill Clinton
Watergate scandal